"What Do You Want to Make Those Eyes at Me For?" is a song written by Joseph McCarthy, Howard Johnson and James V. Monaco in 1916 for the Broadway production Follow Me, in which it was performed by Henry Lewis.

Early recordings
Lewis' version was released as a single on Emerson Records in early 1917. Around the same time, a version by Sam Ash was released in February on Columbia Records, having been recorded on 11 December 1916. It was first a hit when released in March that year by Ada Jones and Billy Murray on Victor Records, peaking at number 3 on the US Billboard chart.

Emile Ford and the Checkmates version 

The song became a UK hit in 1959 when a doo-wop version was recorded by Emile Ford and the Checkmates as the B-side of their single "Don't Tell Me Your Trouble". This B-side became more popular and it topped the charts for six weeks over the Christmas and New Year of 1959/60.  It retained the number one position for the first three weeks of 1960. This earned Ford his first gold disc for sales of over a million, which was "an incredible feat for an unknown singer with his debut recording".  The song was co-produced by Ford and Joe Meek.

Personnel
 Emile Ford – lead vocals, guitar
 George Sweetman – saxophone
 Dave Sweetman – bass
 Ken Street – guitar
 Pete Carter – guitar
 Les Hart – tenor saxophone
 Alan Hawkshaw – piano
 John Cuffley – drums

Charts

Shakin' Stevens version

In 1987, Welsh singer Shakin' Stevens covered the song for his album Let's Boogie. It became his first UK Top 10 hit in two years, peaking at number 5 on the Singles Chart and became his last until the re-entry of "Merry Christmas Everyone" in 2018.

Track listings
7": Epic / SHAKY 5 (UK)

 "What Do You Want to Make Those Eyes at Me For" – 2:49
 "(Yeah) You're Evil" – 2:11

7": Epic / 651255 7 (Australia)

 "What Do You Want to Make Those Eyes at Me For" – 2:49
 "If You're Gonna Cry" – 3:43

EP: Epic / SHAKY G5 (UK, Limited Edition)

 "What Do You Want to Make Those Eyes at Me For" – 2:49
 "(Yeah) You're Evil" – 2:11
 "Merry Christmas Everyone" – 3:39
 "With My Heart" – 2:45

Charts

Other versions

 The 1945 film Nob Hill, starring George Raft, Joan Bennett and Peggy Ann Garner, featured Vivian Blaine singing this song. 
 The 1950 film Wabash Avanue, starring Betty Grable, Victor Mature and Phil Harris, had used the chorus as a transition between scenes, following "I've Been Floating Down the Old Green River"
 In 1960, Danish rock singer Otto Brandenburg recorded a cover of the song that gave him his breakthrough on the Danish music scene.
 In 1963, Italian singer Don Backy recorded another cover of the song, using Italian lyrics, under the title "Ho rimasto". The title is intentionally grammatically wrong (it should have been "Sono rimasto") to catch public attention.
 Les Gray's 1977 recording is on Warner Bros. Records K 17007.
 Swedish rock band Hep Stars incorporated the song into their repertoire, and a live version of it was recorded on their 1965 live album Hep Stars on Stage. 
 Another Swedish singer, Christer Sjögren released recorded the song on his 2008 album Mitt sköna sextiotal.

See also

List of number-one singles from the 1950s (UK)
List of UK Singles Chart number ones of the 1960s
List of number-one singles in Australia during the 1960s
List of number-one hits in Norway

References
Specific

General
Nostalgia Book of Hit *Singles by Jimmy Savile and Tony Jasper (page 60, 1st pub. in G.B. in 1982 by Frederick Muller Ltd.)
 Rock File 4 edited by Charlie Gillett & Simon Firth (page 167, 1st pub. 1976 by Panther Books Ltd., Frogmore, St Albans, Herts. U.K.)

1916 songs
1959 singles
1960 singles
Hep Stars songs
Shakin' Stevens songs
1987 singles
UK Singles Chart number-one singles
Number-one singles in Australia
Number-one singles in Norway
Songs with lyrics by Joseph McCarthy (lyricist)
Songs with lyrics by Howard Johnson (lyricist)
Songs with music by James V. Monaco
Christmas number-one singles in the United Kingdom
Pye Records singles
Epic Records singles